Avis Scott (22 February 1918 – 31 May 2010) was a British film and theatre actress. She was born in London as Avis F Scutt, daughter of Arthur Octavius Scutt and Freda May Palmer. She emigrated to the US in 1957 and married Jack W Matthias in Los Angeles in 1980. She died in Fort Collins, Colorado aged 92. Scott was a BBC continuity announcer during the early 1950s but was fired for apparently being "too sexy" for British television.

Filmography

References

External links

Image: "Avis Scott poses in front of a 3-D television camera", Science Museum Group Collection

1918 births
2010 deaths
Actresses from London
English television actresses
English emigrants to the United States
20th-century British businesspeople